WOKT (1080 AM) is a radio station licensed to serve Cannonsburg, Kentucky, United States. The station is owned by Baker Family Stations, through licensee Big River Radio, Inc.

It broadcasts a Christian Talk & Teaching format with several National Bible Teachers and Local Church ministries to the greater Huntington, West Virginia, area.

The station was assigned the WYHY call letters by the Federal Communications Commission on February 6, 2009. It changed its call sign to WONS on January 23, 2015, and to the current WOKT on April 3, 2018.

References

External links

Boyd County, Kentucky
Radio stations established in 1988
1988 establishments in Kentucky
OKT
OKT